Pouye may be,

Pouye language

People
Oumar Pouye
Mor Pouye
Babacar Pouye